Rajince is a village located in the municipality of Preševo, Serbia. According to the 2002 census, the settlement had a population of 1,954 inhabitants. Of these, 1944 (99,48 %) were ethnic Albanians, 2 (0,10 %) were ethnic Serbs, 1 (0,05 %) ethnic Romani, and 6 (0,30 %) others.

References

Populated places in Pčinja District
Albanian communities in Serbia